The 2014–15 Sacramento State Hornets women's basketball team represented California State University, Sacramento during the 2014–15 NCAA Division I women's basketball season. The Hornets, were led by second year head coach Bunky Harkleroad and played their home games at Hornets Nest. They were members of the Big Sky Conference. They finished the season 18–16, 13–5 in Big Sky play to finish in second place. They advanced to the semifinals of the Big Sky tournament where they lost to Northern Colorado. They were invited to the Women's National Invitation Tournament where they defeated Pacific and Eastern Washington in the first and second rounds before losing in the third round to Saint Mary's.

Roster

Schedule

|-
!colspan=9 style="background:#004840; color:#B39650;"| Regular season

|-
!colspan=9 style="background:#004840; color:#B39650;"|  Big Sky Women's Tournament

|-
!colspan=9 style="background:#004840; color:#B39650;"|  WNIT

See also
2014–15 Sacramento State Hornets men's basketball team

References

Sacramento State Hornets women's basketball seasons
Sacramento State
2015 Women's National Invitation Tournament participants